Sebastián Dominguez Montero (born 5 December 1987) is a Chilean footballer who plays for Deportes Temuco.

References

1987 births
Living people
Chilean footballers
Chilean Primera División players
Deportes Temuco footballers
Association football midfielders
Audax Italiano footballers
Unión Temuco footballers
Rangers de Talca footballers